Anne Cofell Saunders is an American television writer and producer.

Career
Anne Cofell Saunders graduated from Northwestern University in Evanston, Illinois, and earned an MFA in playwriting from Ohio University.

After teaching English in Japan and backpacking around the world, she started her TV career working on the Fox series 24 as an assistant and head researcher.   On 24, Cofell Saunders wrote her first freelance TV episode. Shortly afterwards, she was hired as a staff writer on SyFy’s series Battlestar Galactica, where she was nominated for a Hugo Award for her episode “Pegasus" and won a Peabody Award. Since then, Cofell Saunders worked as a writer/producer on Chuck and the final two seasons of Smallville.

In 2013, Cofell Saunders won a Saturn Award for her work as Co-Executive Producer on NBC's Revolution, which was named Best Network Television Series. She was Co-Executive Producer on Amazon's new hit show The Boys, and recently, a Co-Executive Producer on the NBC series Timeless. She is currently working on her Sony pilot entitled Rollback.

Cofell Saunders resides in Los Angeles with her family.

References

External links
 

American television producers
American television writers
Living people
American women television writers
Year of birth missing (living people)
Place of birth missing (living people)
American women television producers
21st-century American women